The 2021 BVIFA National Football League was the 11th season of the competition. Due to the COVID-19 pandemic in the British Virgin Islands, the competition did not begin until 14 February 2021, and concluded on 5 September 2021.

Sugar Boys won the competition, making it their second British Virgin Islands title won, defeating Lion Heart in the two-legged final.

Regular season

Super Six

Championship final 
First Leg [Jun 27]
Sugar Boys              3-3 Lion Heart              [5-4 pen]
  [German Gonzalez 38, Derol Redhead 81, McGraw Baptiste 90+pen;
   Dwayne Smith 36, 62pen, Nicarious Watt 74]

Second Leg [Sep 5]
Lion Heart              0-2 Sugar Boys              
  [McGraw Baptiste 53pen, German Gonzalez 87]

Third Leg [if necessary]
Sugar Boys              n/p Lion Heart

Champions

References 

2020
2020–21 in Caribbean football leagues
2020 in British Virgin Islands sport
2021 in British Virgin Islands sport
Association football events postponed due to the COVID-19 pandemic